Lyotchiki (aka Men on Wings and The Pilots) is a 1935 Soviet drama film directed by Yuli Raizman and Grigori Levkoyev. Maxim Gorky called him among the best Soviet filmmakers of that time.

Plot
School Commander Nikolai Rogachyov (Boris Shchukin) and famous aerobatic pilot, is in charge of a civilian flying school in Russia. Pilot Sergei Belyaev (Ivan Koval-Samborsky), showing recklessness trying to emulate the test pilot Valery Chkalov), crashes the aircraft assigned to him.

Student flight school Galya Bystrova (Yevgenia Melnikova), who likes Belyaev, unfortunately, seeks to imitate him in the air. Commander Rogachyov falls for young student pilot Gayla, but their difference in age prevents him from declaring his love.

Rogachyov teaches that discipline in the air is necessary to survive as a pilot. Finally, that message begins to make sense to Sergei and Gayla.

Cast

 Ivan Koval-Samborsky as Student Commander Sergei Belyaev
 Yevgenia Melnikova as Flight School Student Galya Bystrova
 Aleksandr Chistyakov as Senior Mechanic Ivan Matveyevich Khrushchev
 Boris Shchukin as Flight School Commander Nikolai Rogachyov
 Grigori Levkoyev as Doctor at airfield (uncredited)
 Inna Fyodorova as Medical attendant (uncredited)
 Zoya Fyodorova as Nurse (uncredited)
 Nikolai Khryashchikov as Appearing (uncredited)
 Maria Klyuchareva as Sanitary (uncredited)
 Ivan Kobozev as Pilot Kobozev (uncredited)

Production
Principal photography for Lyotchiki took place in 1935 on the outskirts of Voronezh, on the airfield (now Holzunov Street in the Northern residential area).

Reception
Under the title, The Pilots, Lyotchiki was released worldwide, while in the United States, it was re-titled Men on Wings. Aviation film historian James H, Farmer in Celluloid Wings: The Impact of Movies on Aviation (1984) described the film's "poor production values." Aviation film historian Stephen Pendo in Aviation in the Cinema (1985) had a similar opinion, noting, "unexciting flying scenes."

in the Soviet films of the time, Lyotchiki was considered a classic.

References

Notes

Citations

Bibliography

 Farmer, James H. Celluloid Wings: The Impact of Movies on Aviation. Blue Ridge Summit, Pennsylvania: Tab Books Inc., 1984. .
 Kherson, Chrysanth. Boris Shchukin: The Path of the Actor. 1954.
 Pendo, Stephen. Aviation in the Cinema. Lanham, Maryland: Scarecrow Press, 1985. .

External links
  
 

1935 films
Russian aviation films
1930s Russian-language films
Soviet drama films
Mosfilm films
Films about aviators
Soviet black-and-white films
1935 drama films
Russian black-and-white films